Pissis is a French surname. Notable people with the surname include:

Albert Pissis (1852–1914), American architect
Pedro José Amadeo Pissis (1812–1889), French geologist

See also
Monte Pissis, mountain in Argentina
Fjortis or Pissis, Finnish slang term